Atriscripta arithmetica is a species of moth of the family Tortricidae. It is found in New Caledonia and Australia, where it has been recorded from Queensland. The habitat consists of rainforests, as well as planted forests.

The wingspan is 16–19 mm. The ground colour of the forewings is greyish to reddish ochreous with a pinkish or vinaceous (the colour of red wine) hue. There is dark red-brown suffusion along the costa, apex and anterior part of the termen. The hindwings are darkish grey.

References

Moths described in 1921
Olethreutini
Moths of Australia